Poverty's No Crime is a German progressive metal band founded in 1991 by Volker Walsemann, Marco Ahrens, Andreas Tegeler, Christian Scheele, and Marcello Maniscalco.  Their first two albums, Symbiosis and The Autumn Years were released under their old record company, Noise Records.  Their subsequent albums were released under the InsideOut record company.  Their albums have received positive attention from the German magazine, Rock Hard.

Discography

References

Metal Storm
2016 Album Review - Metal.de
Laut.de Biographie
Interview in German

External links
 Poverty's No Crime's official website
 Poverty's No Crime - Progarchives.com

Musical groups established in 1991
German progressive metal musical groups
1991 establishments in Germany
Inside Out Music artists
Noise Records artists